Jakes Corner is a census-designated place (CDP) in Gila County, Arizona, United States. The population was 76 at the 2010 census.

Geography
The CDP is located in northwestern Gila County, in the valley of Hardt Creek, a tributary of Tonto Creek. Arizona State Route 188 passes through the community, leading northwest  to State Route 87 and south  to Theodore Roosevelt Lake.

Demographics

References

Census-designated places in Gila County, Arizona